Warren is a village in Jo Daviess County, Illinois, United States. The population was 1,323 at the 2020 census, down from 1,428 at the 2010 census.

Warren was named after Warren Burnett, the first male child born at the site.

History
Captain Alexander Burnett was the first known American settler in present-day Warren; he built a log cabin at the corner of what is now the corner of Main and Water Streets in 1843. In 1851 a stagecoach stop was erected on the Stagecoach Trail, the building still stands and is now serving as the Warren Community Building. The village was platted in 1853 along the proposed route for the Illinois Central Railroad tracks and later growth in Warren was heavily influenced by the presence of the railroad. The main commercial district is concentrated along both sides of the railroad tracks on Main and Railroad Streets. The village was officially incorporated in February 1857.

Geography

Demographics

As of the census of 2000, there were 1,496 people, 622 households, and 408 families residing in the village. The racial makeup of the village was 99.26% White, 0.20% African American, 0.27% Native American, 0.13% from other races, and 0.13% from two or more races. Hispanic or Latino of any race were 1.34% of the population.

There were 622 households, out of which 28.6% had children under the age of 18 living with them, 54.5% were married couples living together, 8.7% had a female householder with no husband present, and 34.4% were non-families. 30.1% of all households were made up of individuals, and 19.1% had someone living alone who was 65 years of age or older.  The average household size was 2.41 and the average family size was 3.00.

In the village, the age distribution of the population shows 24.1% under the age of 18, 8.0% from 18 to 24, 25.0% from 25 to 44, 22.7% from 45 to 64, and 20.3% who were 65 years of age or older.  The median age was 41 years. For every 100 females, there were 93.8 males.  For every 100 females age 18 and over, there were 90.3 males.

The median income for a household in the village was $37,083, and the median income for a family was $45,263. Males had a median income of $32,277 versus $22,727 for females. The per capita income for the village was $19,611.  About 4.4% of families and 6.4% of the population were below the poverty line, including 6.8% of those under age 18 and 7.1% of those age 65 or over.

Festivals
The Village of Warren holds "The Pumpkin Festival" every year on the last weekend of September. The festival includes a large parade, arts and crafts, and Fall produce. Warren is also the location of the Jo Daviess County Fair. This is usually held around the first week of August. The event is the oldest county fair in the state of Illinois. It is also a location of the Stagecoach Trail Festival, held along the Stagecoach Trail.

Notable people 

 Abner Dalrymple, left fielder with the Milwaukee Grays, Chicago White Stockings, Pittsburgh Alleghenys, and Milwaukee Brewers; buried in Warren at Elmwood cemetery
 George Engebretson, member of the Wisconsin State Senate, born in Warren

Historical landmarks
Old Stone Hotel

References

External links
Jo Daviess County

Villages in Jo Daviess County, Illinois
Villages in Illinois
Populated places established in 1853